The Zero X is an electric motorcycle manufactured by Zero Motorcycles.

Specifications
The wheels are driven by hardened steel 420 chain and direct drive gearing.

Braking is performed by six-piston calipers per axle, with a  front rotor.

It includes  rear rim with  rear tire and  front tire.

Recharging is done using 120 V or 240 V with a charging time of two hours.

Other features include USB port that allow access to the bike's motor controls.

Extreme Package includes Higher Power Perm Motor with 10% more power over stock and faster top end speeds, customized stronger fork.

2009
Changes include improved chassis, which features hydroformed top tub, larger swing arms, thru-axle rear hub, shot-peened and anodized frame, organic frame gusseting, new number plate. As a result, it was  heavier (now ) than 2008 model.

Prototype of 2009 model was unveiled in 2008 Alternative Energy and Transportation Expo in Santa Monica, California.

Sales
On 24 September 2008, Zero Motorcycles announced all 2008 models had been sold out.

References

External links

Official Webpage
Electric Motorcycle
Technologies To Prevent Motorcycle Accidents

X
Electric motorcycles